Viktor L. Ginzburg is a Russian-American mathematician who has worked on Hamiltonian dynamics and symplectic and Poisson geometry. As of 2017, Ginzburg is Professor of Mathematics at the University of California, Santa Cruz.

Education
Ginzburg completed his Ph.D. at the University of California, Berkeley  in 1990; his dissertation, On closed characteristics of 2-forms, was written under the supervision of Alan Weinstein.

Research
Ginzburg is best known for his work on the Conley conjecture, which asserts the existence of infinitely many periodic points for Hamiltonian diffeomorphisms in many cases, and for his counterexample (joint with Başak  Gürel) to the Hamiltonian Seifert conjecture which constructs a Hamiltonian with an energy level with no periodic trajectories.

Some of his other works concern coisotropic intersection theory, and Poisson–Lie groups.

Awards
Ginzburg was elected as a Fellow of the American Mathematical Society in the 2020 Class, for "contributions to Hamiltonian dynamical systems and symplectic topology and in particular studies into the existence and non-existence of periodic orbits".

References

External links
 

Living people
1962 births
20th-century Russian mathematicians
21st-century Russian mathematicians
University of California, Santa Cruz faculty
University of California, Berkeley alumni
20th-century American mathematicians
21st-century American mathematicians
Fellows of the American Mathematical Society